Paul Tseng was a Chinese-American (Hakka Taiwanese) and Canadian applied mathematician and a professor at the Department of Mathematics at the University of Washington, in Seattle, Washington. Tseng was recognized by his peers to be one of the leading optimization researchers of his generation. On August 13, 2009, Paul Tseng went missing while kayaking in the Yangtze River in the Yunnan province of China and is presumed dead.

Biography 
Paul Tseng was born September 21, 1959 in Hsinchu, Taiwan. In December 1970, Tseng's family moved to Vancouver, British Columbia. Tseng received his B.Sc. from Queen's University in 1981 and his Ph.D. from Massachusetts Institute of Technology in 1986. In 1990 Tseng moved to the University of Washington's Department of Mathematics. Tseng has conducted research primarily in continuous optimization and secondarily in discrete optimization and distributed computation.

Research 
Tseng made many contributions to mathematical optimization, publishing many articles and helping to develop quality software that has been widely used.
He published over 120 papers in optimization and had close collaborations with several colleagues, including Dimitri Bertsekas and Zhi-Quan Tom Luo.

Tseng's research subjects include:
 Efficient algorithms for structured convex programs and network flow problems,
 Complexity analysis of interior point methods for linear programming,
 Parallel and distributed computing,
 Error bounds and convergence analysis of iterative algorithms for optimization problems and variational inequalities,
 Interior point methods and semidefinite relaxations for hard quadratic and matrix optimization problems, and
 Applications of large scale optimization techniques in signal processing and machine learning.

In his research, Tseng gave a new proof for the sharpest complexity result for path-following interior-point methods for linear programming. Furthermore, together with Tom Luo, he resolved a long-standing open question on the convergence of matrix splitting algorithms for linear complementarity problems and affine variational inequalities. Tseng was the first to establish the convergence of the affine scaling algorithm for linear programming in the presence of degeneracy.
Tseng has coauthored (with his Ph.D. advisor, Dimitri Bertsekas) a publicly available network optimization program, called RELAX, which has been widely used in industry and academia for research purposes. This software has been used by statisticians like Paul R. Rosenbaum and Donald Rubin in their work on propensity score matching. Tseng's software for matching has similarly been used in nonparametric statistics to implement exact tests. Tseng has also developed a program called ERELAXG, for network optimization problems with gains. In 2010 conferences in his honor were held at the University of Washington and at Fudan University in Shanghai. Tseng's personal web page can be accessed in the exact state it was at the time of his disappearance, and contains many of his writings.

Travels and disappearance
Paul Tseng was an ardent bicyclist, kayaker and backpacker. He took many adventurous trips, including kayak tours along the Mekong, the Danube, the Nile and the Amazon. On August 13, 2009, Paul Tseng went missing while kayaking in the Yantze river near Lijiang, in Yunnan province of China and is now presumed dead.

See also

 Computer networking
 Dynamic programming
 List of convexity topics
 List of people who disappeared
 Neural network
 Reinforcement learning

Notes

External links 
Math Programming Society
Publications from DBLP.
Publications from Google Scholar.

1959 births
2000s missing person cases
20th-century American mathematicians
21st-century American mathematicians
American computer scientists
American electrical engineers
American people of Chinese descent
American people of Taiwanese descent
Canadian computer scientists
Canadian electrical engineers
Canadian emigrants to the United States
Canadian mathematicians
Canadian people of Chinese descent
Control theorists
Hakka scientists
Massachusetts Institute of Technology alumni
Massachusetts Institute of Technology faculty
Missing person cases in China
Missing people
Naturalized citizens of Canada
N'Djamena
People from Hsinchu
Queen's University at Kingston alumni
Scientists from Vancouver
Systems scientists
Taiwanese emigrants to Canada
Academic staff of the University of British Columbia
University of Washington faculty